Cuddalore district is a coastal district in the South Indian state of Tamil Nadu. There are a list of notable people in the district.

 Vallalar, saint
 A. Subbarayalu Reddiar, first Chief Minister of Tamil Nadu
 Vetrimaaran, director
 N. S. Ramaswami, journalist
 K. Veeramani 
 Er. N. Rajendran, former Chief Engineer National Highways
 Jayakanthan, journalist
 Aswath Damodaran, Professor of Finance at the Stern School of Business at New York
 Kriya Babaji
 V. Vaithilingam, former Chief Minister of Puducherry
 Peter Tranchell, music composer
 Haji Mastan
 Bill Greswell, First Class Cricket Player who played for Somerset
 Vasanth, Indian film director and screenwriter
 Kumar G. Venkatesh, Indian Filmmaker and Indo-Russian Cultural Ambassador

References

Cuddalore
people